Pijuayal is a town in Pebas District, Mariscal Ramón Castilla Province, Loreto, Peru.

After the 1995 Cenepa War and the signing of the Brasilia Presidential Act, both signatory countries agreed to grant Ecuador two territories in Pijuayal and Saramiriza for 50 years, where Trade and Navigation Centers (CECONA) would be established in order to provide the country an outlet to the Amazon river. Protests from local tribes have slowed town the process, however.

See also
Saramiriza

References

Populated places in the Loreto Region